NAMOC may refer to

 National Art Museum of China
 Northwest Atlantic Mid-Ocean Channel